Pierre Alexandre Tremblay (born March 13, 1975) is a Canadian electroacoustic music composer who was born in Montreal, Quebec, and currently living in Huddersfield, England, UK.

Recordings
 Alter ego (empreintes DIGITALes, IMED 0680, 2006)
 la rage (empreintes DIGITALes, IMED 0999, 2009)
 La marée (empreintes DIGITALes, IMED 13123, 2013)

List of works
 au Croisé, le silence, seul, tient lieu de parole (2000)
 autoportrait (2001)
 Binary (Virtual Rapper Remix) (1998)
 la cloche fêlée (2004)
 Fiez-vous sur moi (1995)
 fugue; qui sent le temps? (1997)
 La rage (2004–2005), free jazz drummer and electronics
 Walk That Way. Tuesday, Turn. (2006), videomusic
 Le tombeau des fondeurs (2008), Baschet-Malbus piano
 Un clou, son marteau et le baton (2008-2009), piano and electronics (written for Sarah Nicholls)
 La rupture inéluctable (2010-2011), bass clarinet and electronics (written for Heather Roche)

External links
 His personal site

1975 births
Living people
Canadian male classical composers
Electroacoustic music composers
Jules Léger Prize for New Chamber Music winners
Canadian classical composers
Musicians from Montreal
21st-century Canadian composers
21st-century Canadian male musicians